Sleeping with Ghosts is the fourth studio album by British alternative rock band Placebo. It was recorded from late 2002 to early 2003 and released on 1 April 2003 by record labels Virgin and Hut.

Sleeping with Ghosts reached number 11 in the UK Albums Chart, and received a generally favourable reaction from music critics.

Content 

Frontman Brian Molko, who is known to be a fan of the band Sonic Youth, references lyrics from their album Sister on "Plasticine" ("Beauty lies inside the eye of another youthful dream" directly references "Beauty lies in the eyes of another's dream" from Sonic Youth's "Beauty Lies in the Eye").

The album has several songs based on a theme of relationships, such as relationships that end badly ("The Bitter End"), power struggles in relationships ("Special Needs") or the idea that some are meant to be eternal soulmates (the title track). Brian Molko told Kerrang! magazine: "I'm looking back to what's happened in my past emotional decade, trying to understand it. Trying to exorcise the ghosts and the demons of relationships past. It's the old cliché of it being therapeutic but it does work for me in that way."

Another interview has Molko explaining:

The album title's about carrying the ghosts of your relationships with you, to the point where sometimes a smell or a situation or an item of clothing they bought brings a person back. For me it's about the relationship that you have with your memories. They inhabit your dreams sometimes. There can be a lot in the future that's gonna remind you of the ghost of relationships past. So I see the album as a collection of short stories about a handful of relationships. Most of them mine. In a way writing the songs helps me to get a lot of the nasty feelings off my chest and put them in a box, and therefore have a bit more of an objective discourse with those emotions because you've done something positive with them, you've rid yourself of them.

Release 

Sleeping with Ghosts was released on 1 April 2003. The CD came with the Copy Control protection system in some regions. It reached number 11 in the UK Albums Chart.

A Special Edition version of the album was released on 22 September 2003 worldwide, featuring a diverse selection of cover versions that the band had recorded in previous years. This was re-released as a download-only album in 2007 under the name Covers. This is their last album released under Hut.

Reception 

Sleeping with Ghosts received "Generally favorable reviews" from critics, and holds an approval rating of 64 out of 100 on Metacritic.

Michael Idov of Pitchfork wrote "No peaks, no gorges, just a steady oscillation between adequate and inspired. Sleeping with Ghosts is a remarkably level collection of guitar pop, simultaneously less glammy and less pungent than Placebo's earlier stuff." Mojo wrote "There's some terrific and accessible stuff here [...] but the result is still an album that retreads old Placebo themes." Q magazine called it "spikily brilliant".

Track listing 
All tracks written and performed by Placebo

Charts and certifications

Weekly charts

Year-end charts

Certifications and sales

Personnel 

 Placebo

 Brian Molko – vocals, guitar, keyboards, saxophone on "Something Rotten", drums on "English Summer Rain"
 Steve Hewitt – drums, percussion
 Stefan Olsdal – bass guitar, guitar, keyboards, piano, backing vocals

 Additional personnel

 Simon Breed – harmonica on "Protect Me from What I Want"

 Technical personnel

 Jim Abbiss – production
 Jean Baptiste Mondino – sleeve art direction and photography
 Jim Barny – mixing at Mayfair Studios, recording at Townhouse Studios and Sarm West Studios
 Andy Davies – engineering assistance at Sarm West Studios
 Bill Lloyd – additional recording, engineering
 Sean Magee – mastering at Abbey Road Studios
 Fergus Peterkin – engineering assistance at Mayfair Studios
 Danny Porter – engineering assistance at Townhouse Studios
 See Studio – sleeve design and art direction
 Tom Stanley – engineering assistance at Townhouse Studios

References

External links 

 

2003 albums
Placebo (band) albums
Albums produced by Jim Abbiss
Hut Records albums
Virgin Records albums